Kilfera Parish  on the New South Wales - Queensland border in Bourke Shire is a remote civil Parish, of Irrara County, a cadasteral division of New South Wales.

Geography
The topography of the area is flat and arid with a Köppen climate classification of BSh (Hot semi arid).

The economy in the parish is based on broad acre agriculture, mainly Cattle, and sheep. The parish has no towns in the parish and the nearest settlement is  Hungerford, Queensland to the west.

See also
Irrara County#Parishes within this county

References

Localities in New South Wales
Geography of New South Wales
Populated places in New South Wales
Far West (New South Wales)